Ryan Sweeney may refer to:
 Ryan Sweeney (baseball)
 Ryan Sweeney (footballer)